Haydar, Haidar, and other variant spellings, is an Arabic name. It may also refer to:

Places
Haidar, a village in Casimcea Commune, Tulcea County, Romania
Haidar Usmonov, town and jamoat in north-west Tajikistan
Haydar, Akyurt, village in the District of Akyurt, Ankara Province, Turkey

Other uses
"Haydar Haydar", a traditional Alevi song

See also
Babaheydar,  also Romanized as Bābā Ḩeydar or Bāba Haīdar, city in Iran
Haidari, a suburb of Athens, Greece

 Haider, a name

Haider (film), 2014 Indian film by Vishal Bhardwaj

Haider (soundtrack), soundtrack of the 2014 film of the same name 
Haydarpaşa, neighborhood within the Kadıköy district on the Asian part of Istanbul, Turkey
Nishan-e-Haider, the highest military decoration given by Pakistan
Hyder (disambiguation)
Hyder (name)
Hyderi (name)
Hyderi, a neighbourhood in Karachi, Pakistan